Mallaig railway station is a railway station serving the ferry port of Mallaig, Lochaber, in the Highland region of Scotland. The station building is Category C listed. ScotRail, who manage the station, operate most of the services.

History 

Mallaig station opened on 1 April 1901.

The station was laid out as an island platform with tracks on either side. There were sidings on both sides, and a turntable to the south of the station, on the west side of the line, right beside the sea.

Until 1968 two tracks continued down onto the pier, which was built and originally owned by the West Highland Railway Company. The tracks were removed when the harbour passed from British Rail ownership to that of the Mallaig Harbour Authority.

The glass overall roof was removed in 1975 and the ticket office was extended at the same time. In 1978, Lochaber divisional planning committee agreed to a  proposed £34,000 extension to the station which allowed for the station to be extended in a south western direction on part of the existing platform area. The extension included permission for a permanent tourist office within the existing building, and also a parcels office, mess room and concourse.

In 1998 Railtrack announced expenditure of £90,000 to repair the station.

Signalling 

From the time of its opening in 1901, the Mallaig Line was worked throughout by the electric token system. Mallaig signal box was situated south of the station, on the east side of the line.

Mallaig signal box was closed as a token station, but retained as a ground frame with four levers. All the semaphore signals were removed.

On 6 December 1987 the Radio Electronic Token Block (RETB) system was commissioned between Mallaig Junction (now called 'Fort William Junction') and Mallaig. The RETB is controlled from a Signalling Centre at Banavie railway station.

In November 1992, the former signal box was demolished and replaced by an ordinary ground frame. The Train Protection & Warning System was installed in 2003.

Facilities 
The station is equipped with a spacious ticket office (adjacent to the car park), inside of which is a help point and the toilets. The island platform has seats, cycle racks and luggage trolleys. The station has step-free access.

Passenger volume 

The statistics cover twelve month periods that start in April.

Services 

The railway line from Mallaig is noted as a scenic route, especially as it passes along the Glenfinnan Viaduct  out of Mallaig, so many journeys to and from the station are typically leisure travellers.

Most scheduled train services out of Mallaig railway station are operated by ScotRail. Currently, four trains a day depart Monday to Saturdays from Mallaig for Fort William, three of which continue to Glasgow Queen Street (the fourth terminates at Fort William to connect with the Caledonian Sleeper to London Euston). On Sundays, three trains depart for Fort William, with two trains continuing on to Glasgow.

Mallaig is also the destination of a special tourist steam train operated by West Coast Railways, The Jacobite, which runs sightseeing trips non-stop to Fort William running twice daily, Monday to Friday (with additional weekend services during the summer months).

Mallaig Ferry Terminal 

Caledonian MacBrayne operate ferry services from Mallaig to Armadale on the Isle of Skye, a thirty-minute sailing, as well as daily services to the Small Isles of Canna, Rùm, Eigg and Muck, although the timetable, itinerary and calling points differ from day to day. A small, independent ferry service run by former lifeboatman Bruce Watt sails up Loch Nevis to the remote village of Inverie in Knoydart, and also calls by prior arrangement at Tarbet in Morar, locations that are only accessible by sea. Both Cal Mac and Bruce Watt also offer non-landing sightseeing tickets.

See also 
Mallaig Extension Railway
West Highland Railway

References

Bibliography

External links 

 Video footage of the station on YouTube

Railway stations in Highland (council area)
Former North British Railway stations
Railway stations in Great Britain opened in 1901
Railway stations served by ScotRail
Railway stations serving harbours and ports in the United Kingdom
James Miller railway stations
1901 establishments in Scotland
Mallaig
Category C listed buildings in Highland (council area)
Listed railway stations in Scotland